Dan Coleman (born January 12, 1972, in New York City) is a composer and music publisher.

He studied music at the University of Pennsylvania, the Juilliard School, and the Aspen Music Festival and School where his teachers included George Tsontakis, Jay Reise, George Crumb, William Bolcom, Robert Beaser, Stephen Albert and Bruce Adolphe. He is the first composer alumnus of Young Concert Artists.

His music has been commissioned and performed by leading ensembles, including the American Composers Orchestra, The Chamber Music Society of Lincoln Center, Cypress String Quartet, Dallas Symphony, Fresno Philharmonic, Honolulu Symphony, Indianapolis Symphony, Knoxville Symphony Orchestra, New York Chamber Symphony, Orpheus Chamber Orchestra, Pacific Northwest Ballet, San Jose Chamber Orchestra, Festival Mozaic Orchestra, Seattle Chamber Music Society, St. Luke's Chamber Ensemble, St. Paul Chamber Orchestra, Utah Symphony, and the Tucson Symphony Orchestra, where he has held the post of composer-in-residence since 2002.

In 2004 he and Bob Donnelly founded Modern Works Music Publishing, an independent music publishing administrator.

Selected works
Orchestra
 long ago, this radiant day (1994)
 Chamber Symphony (1997)
 The Voice of the Rain (1997)
 Focoso (2002)
 L'alma respira (2002)
 Imagining the Dance (2019)

Concertante
 Pavanes and Symmetries for flute and string orchestra (2000)

Chamber music
 Dezembrum for viola and cello (1992)
The Only Dance There Is for violin and piano (1993)
Sonata in Two Acts for violin and piano (1996)
Sonata notturna for violin and piano (1997)
Sad and Ancient Phrases for violin and piano (1999)
 String Quartet No. 1 "Quartetto ricercare" (1999, revised 2003)
"Quintet (after Elizabeth Bishop)" (2001)
Summer for viola and piano (2003)
 String Quartet No. 2 (2004)
 String Quartet No. 3 "together, as the river" (2016)

Piano
 Burden of Dreams (1993)
 Quasi fantasia (1998)
 Night Singing (2005)

Awards and honors
Dan Coleman has been the recipient of various awards and honors:
2004 Copland House / Sylvia Goldstein Award
2003 Indianapolis Symphony Orchestra / Marilyn K. Glick Composer's Award
2001 NFMC Beyer Composition Award
2001 Symphony in C Composer's Competition
2001 Auros Group for New Music Composer Award
2001 New Music USA (Meet The Composer) Music Alive Grant
2000 Arizona Commission on the Arts Fellowship
1999 Tisch School First Run Festival Best Original Score
1998 Whitaker Commission from the American Composers Orchestra
1997 Victor Herbert/ASCAP award for his Sonata in Two Acts
1996 grant from Commissioning Music/USA (a partnership between the NEA, Meet The Composer and the Helen F. Whitaker Fund)
1995 Charles Ives Scholarship from the American Academy of Arts and Letters
1995 First Music orchestral commission from the New York Youth Symphony.

Selected discography

as composer
1996 Metamorphosen Chamber Orchestra (Albany Records 194)
2004 Kevin Cobb "One" (Summit Records 401)
2006 Sheila Browne & Wesley Baldwin "Lutoslawski, Clarke, Beethoven, Hindesmith, Coleman, Piston: Works for Viola & Cello" (Centaur 2798)
2006 Lara Downes "Dream of Me" (Tritone Records B000H4VVWU)
2007 Carol Rodland "Viola Swirl" (Crystal Records 834)
2015 Jennifer Frautschi & John Blacklow "American Duos" (Albany Records 1593)
2018 Johanna Lundy "Canyon Songs: Art, Nature, Devotion" (MSR Classics MS 1684)
2018 Alice K. Dade "Living Music" (Naxos 8559831)

as arranger
1995 Lisa Loeb, Tails 
1997 Lisa Loeb, Firecracker
1999 Music from the motion Picture Anywhere But Here
2002 Lisa Loeb, Cake and Pie
2006 Calexico, Garden Ruin  
2013 Joshua Redman, Walking Shadows
2013 Calexico, Spritoso

as conductor
2010 Brad Mehldau, Highway Rider
2012 Jake Shimabukuro, Grand Ukulele

References

External links
 
 Modern Works Music Publishing

1972 births
Living people
21st-century American composers
21st-century American male musicians
American composers
American male composers
Aspen Music Festival and School alumni
Juilliard School alumni
University of Pennsylvania alumni